Cynanchum acidum is a species of flowering plant in the family Apocynaceae, typically found in the arid parts of peninsular India where it is used in religious sacrifices. The plant is religiously linked to Hinduism  and is believed to be a major ingredient of the Soma in Ancient India.

Description
Cynanchum acidum is a perennial leafless, jointed shrub with green, cylindrical, fleshy glabrous with twining branches having milky white latex and with its leaves reduced to scales. Its flowers are white or pale greenish white, are fragrant and grow in umbels on branch extremities. The fruits follicles taper at both ends; seeds are flat, ovate, comose. This leafless plant grows in rocky, sterile places all over India.

Uses

As a beverage

The plant yields an abundance of a mildly acidulous milky juice, and travellers like nomadic cowherds suck its tender shoots to allay thirst. Traditional accounts hold that Cynanchum acidum is the Soma plant of the Vedas. The Rigveda, ix. says the purifying Soma, like the sea rolling its waves, has poured forth songs, hymns and thoughts.

Medicinal
The plant is bitter, acrid, cooling, alterant, narcotic, emetic, antiviral, and rejuvenating.

India
In classical Indian medicine it is considered useful in vitiated conditions of pitta, dipsia, viral infection, hydrophobia, psychopathy and general debility.

References

External links
 Sarcostemma acidum (Roxb.) Voigt. - e.Charak

acidum
Medicinal plants of Asia
Soma (drink)